Pervomaysky is a rural locality (a settlement) in Solonetskoye Rural Settlement, Vorobyovsky District, Voronezh Oblast, Russia. The population was 556 as of 2010. There are 11 streets.

Geography 
Pervomaysky is located 5 km west of Vorobyovka (the district's administrative centre) by road. Kvashino is the nearest rural locality.

References 

Rural localities in Vorobyovsky District